Rita Baga is the stage name of Jean-François Guevremont (born May 27, 1987), a Canadian drag queen from Montreal, Quebec, who is most noted as a top three finalist in the first season of Canada's Drag Race. In 2022, it was announced that Rita Baga would be a judge and the main host on Drag Race Belgique, a Belgian version of the franchise. She also returned to compete in Canada's Drag Race: Canada vs. the World in 2022.

In addition to performing as Rita Baga, Guevremont worked as director of programming for Fierté Montréal.

Education
Guevremont is an alumnus of the Université du Québec à Montréal, where he studied human resources and tourist development.

Career
Guevremont began his drag career in 2007, performing at Cabaret Mado for the birthday show of his friend Dream, performing a medley from the film Sister Act with colleagues Marla and Célinda. Initially his drag name was Rita d'Marde (A phonetic play on the words "pile of shit", the name sounds like "Laugh, asshole !"), which he changed to Rita Baga in 2010 when he began performing at Cabaret Mado as a regular. In 2013, Rita Baga appeared on La Guerre des clans, V's French-language version of Family Feud.

In 2014, Rita Baga became the permanent host of Bagalicious, the Sunday night program at Cabaret Mado. In 2016 she launched MX Fierté, a cross-Canada drag pageant held in conjunction with Fierté Montréal; in the same year, she travelled to Mumbai, India to perform at the KASHISH Mumbai International Queer Film Festival.

In 2017 Guevremont participated in Ils de jour, elles de nuit, an Ici ARTV documentary series about drag queens, alongside Barbada de Barbades, Gaby, Lady Boom Boom, Lady Pounana and Tracy Trash.

The inaugural season of Canada's Drag Race filmed in late 2019, and the cast was revealed to the public in 2020 several weeks before the show's premiere on July 2. Rita Baga was one of two queens from Montreal, alongside Kiara, to appear in the season. In August 2020, with Fierté Montréal suspended due to the COVID-19 pandemic in Canada, Guevremont in his role as director of programming helped to coordinate a special online edition of the annual Drag Superstars show, which featured all of the queens from Canada's Drag Race in prerecorded video performances. While most other queens performed lipsyncs to established pop songs, Guevremont used his segment to premiere the music video for Rita Baga's own original single "Something Spiritual". Rita Baga made it to the Top 3 in Canada's Drag Race, with Scarlett BoBo and Priyanka, and won the most weekly challenges over the course of the season, but ultimately lost the crown to Priyanka. She placed high, but did not win, in the Snatch Game challenge for her performance as Édith Piaf.

Following the conclusion of the Canada's Drag Race season, the cast announced a cross-Canada tour, to be performed at drive-in venues due to the ongoing social distancing restrictions remaining in place during the COVID-19 pandemic. The tour was hosted by Brooke Lynn Hytes; as the Top 3 finalists, Priyanka, Scarlett Bobo and Rita Baga appeared at every date on the tour, while other cast members performed at selected dates based on availability.

Alongside Priyanka, Scarlett BoBo and Jimbo, Rita Baga participated in an online panel as part of the 2020 Just for Laughs festival.

In December 2020, it was announced that Rita Baga would be part of the cast of the first season of the Quebec version of Big Brother Célébrités. She was evicted on day 29 in twelfth place.

In April 2021 it was announced that Rita Baga would be one of the regular panelists, alongside Roxane Bruneau, on Qui sait chanter?, the Quebec adaptation of I Can See Your Voice. In July, Rita Baga and Jean-Thomas Jobin, who had been one of her housemates on Big Brother Célebrités, cohosted a Carte blanche gala at the 2021 Just for Laughs festival.

In September, she had a guest role appearing as herself in a fifth-season episode of Madame Lebrun, the Quebec adaptation of Mrs. Brown's Boys.

In October 2021, Rita Baga launched Créature, a theatre tour blending lipsynching, live singing and comedy segments. The tour received a Félix Award nomination for Best Variety or Reinterpretation Concert at the 44th Félix Awards in 2022.

In November, she was announced as the host of La Drag en moi, a makeover series based on Dragnificent! in which drag queens help ordinary people to look their best for an important event; the series premiered on Crave in August 2022.

In July 2022, she was announced as the host for the upcoming Drag Race Belgique, Belgium's Drag Race spin-off.

On September 18, 2022, Rita Baga, Barbada de Barbades and Mona de Grenoble presented an award at the Prix Gémeaux ceremony, reading the nominees before bringing out Gisèle Lullaby, the third season winner of Canada's Drag Race, to announce the winner.

She competed in Canada's Drag Race: Canada vs. the World in 2022, portraying Montreal drag icon Guilda in the Snatch Game.

Controversy 

On November 6, 2022, Baga issued an apology throughout social media due to an act of blackface as Amber Riley on Glee.

Filmography

Television

Web series

Discography

Featured singles

Awards and nominations

References

1987 births
Living people
21st-century Canadian male singers
Big Brother Canada contestants
Canada's Drag Race contestants
Canadian drag queens
Canadian LGBT singers
French Quebecers
LGBT in Quebec
Singers from Montreal
Université du Québec à Montréal alumni
Drag Race Belgique
21st-century Canadian LGBT people